The women's singles wheelchair tennis tournament at the 2020 Paralympic Games in Tokyo is held at the Ariake Tennis Park in Kōtō, Tokyo from 28 August and 3 September 2021.

The reigning champion was Jiske Griffioen, who was not defending her title, having retired in 2017.

Diede de Groot succeeded in the fourth leg of a Golden Slam, having won the Australian Open, French Open and Wimbledon earlier in the year.

Seeds

Draw 

 BPC = Bipartite Invitation

Finals

Section 1

Section 2

Section 3

Section 4

References 

Wheelchair tennis at the 2020 Summer Paralympics